Emilio Álvarez Icaza Longoria (born 31 March 1965) is a Mexican human rights ombudsman and activist serving as a senator in the LXIV Legislature of the Mexican Congress from Mexico City. He previously served as the president of the Inter-American Commission on Human Rights.

Life and political career
Álvarez Icaza was born on 31 March 1965 in Mexico City, Mexico. Álvarez Icaza holds a degree in sociology from the National Autonomous University of Mexico (UNAM) and a master's degree in social sciences from the Latin American Social Sciences Institute. From 1986 to 1988 and again from 1990 to 1999, he worked at the Centro Nacional de Comunicación Social, becoming its leader from August 1994 to January 1999.

In 1999, he became one of the first electoral councilors of the new Instituto Electoral del Distrito Federal.

Álvarez Icaza has taught graduate courses at a variety of schools, including the UNAM, Universidad Iberoamericana, and the Center for Humanities Teaching and Studies of the State of Morelos. Álvarez Icaza is also a member of the Movement for Peace with Justice and Dignity, who were organizers of the main protests during the October 15th Movement.

President of the IACHR
On 19 July 2012, Álvarez Icaza was chosen to be the executive secretary of the Inter-American Commission on Human Rights (IACHR) for a four-year term, taking the post on 16 August. While serving on the IACHR, the Procuraduría General de la República opened an investigation against him for alleged misuse of funds given by the Mexican government to the IACHR to finance its activities relating to the Ayotzinapa mass disappearance; the investigation was ultimately abandoned.

In 2016, he was replaced by Paulo Abrão of Brazil.

Ahora movement and presidential bid

On 27 February 2017, Álvarez Icaza announced he was launching a political movement in Mexico City, known as Ahora (Now), initially with the goal of putting citizen candidates on the ballot in 2018 and as a vehicle for an independent presidential bid. That October, citing the outcome of the State of Mexico election earlier that year, he withdrew his candidacy, worried that the election had been too similar to that of 1988 and declaring that he "would not be useful to the PRI", like other independent candidates who he claimed had their candidacies secretly supported by the presidency.

2018 Senate candidacy

In March 2018, Álvarez Icaza announced that Ahora would back the Por México al Frente coalition, including presidential candidate Ricardo Anaya Cortés, and that the movement would run legislative candidates in the coalition, with three candidates for Senate and five for the Chamber of Deputies. Álvarez joined the PAN-PRD-MC Senate ticket for Mexico City alongside Xóchitl Gálvez Ruiz. The ticket finished second in the election, giving Álvarez a seat as the first minority senator.

On 23 August 2018, Álvarez Icaza announced he would serve as an independent senator and not join the caucuses of any of the parties that ran him for Senate, noting that he is not a member of any of them; additionally, the other Ahora candidates elected, Ana Lucía Riojas Martínez and Carlos Morales Vázquez, would enter the legislature as independents, though they ran on the PRD and PAN lists, respectively.

Personal life

Álvarez Icaza is married and has three children.

References

Mexican sociologists
Living people
Human rights in Latin America
1965 births
National Autonomous University of Mexico alumni
21st-century Mexican politicians
People from Mexico City
Members of the Senate of the Republic (Mexico) for Mexico City
Senators of the LXIV and LXV Legislatures of Mexico